Angela Manalang Gloria (1907–1995) was a Filipina poet who wrote in English.

Early life
Angela Marie Legaspi Manalang was born on August 24, 1907, in Guagua, Pampanga to parents, Felipe Dizon Manalang (born in Mexico, Pampanga) and Tomasa Legaspi. However, their family later settled in the Bicol Region, particularly in Tabaco, Albay. She studied at St. Agnes Academy in Legaspi, where she graduated valedictorian in elementary. In her senior year, she moved to St. Scholastica's College in Malate, Manila, where her writing started to get noticed.

Angela Manalang was among the first generation female students at the University of the Philippines. Angela initially enrolled in law, as suggested by her father. However, with the advice of her professor C.V. Wickers, who also became her mentor, she eventually transferred to literature.

Writing
It was also during her education at the University of the Philippines that she and poet, Jose Garcia Villa developed a lifelong rivalry. Both poets vied for the position of literary editor of The Philippine Collegian, which Manalang eventually held for two successive years. In her junior year, she was quietly engaged to Celedonio Gloria whom she married. She graduated summa cum laude with the degree of Ph.B. in March 1929.

After graduation, Manalang-Gloria worked briefly for the Philippine Herald Mid-Week Magazine. However, this was cut short when she contracted tuberculosis.

Achievements
She was the author of Revolt from Hymen, a poem protesting against marital rape, which caused her denial by an all-male jury from winning the Philippine's Commonwealth Literary Awards in 1940.  She was also the author of the poetry collection, Poems, first published in 1940 (and revised in 1950).  The collection contained the best of her early work as well as unpublished poems written between 1934 and 1938. Her last poem, Old Maid Walking on a City Street can also be found in the collection. This book was her entry to the Commonwealth Literary Awards, losing to Rafael Zulueta y da Costa's verse Like the Molave.

Personal life

On March 11, 1945, her husband Celedonio and her son Ruben were attacked by a Japanese patrol in Alitagtag, Batangas. Though her husband died, Ruben was able to survive, yet his trauma had been so severe that he could not bring himself to recount the attack. This event left Manalang-Gloria a young widow with three children to support, which forced her to abandon writing and enter the abaca business, which she successfully managed.

See also
 Maria Rosa Luna Henson
 Ninotchka Rosca
Paz Márquez-Benítez

References

Kapampangan people
Writers from Pampanga
People from Legazpi, Albay
Filipino writers
1907 births
1995 deaths
20th-century Filipino women writers
20th-century Filipino writers
University of the Philippines alumni
People from Guagua
Bikolano writers